The Vallard Atlas is an atlas produced in Dieppe, Northern France, in 1547. It was ascribed to Nicolas Vallard. However, there is a degree of uncertainty over his authorship. Nowadays, it is believed that the Vallard Atlas was developed from an earlier Portuguese prototype.

History 
The Vallard Atlas is one of the most renowned atlases of the 16th century. It is an example of work from the Dieppe School of Cartography. Several doubts were raised about the authorship of the atlas; it was generally assumed that Nicolas Vallard was only the first owner of the atlas. Credit for the work was given to an anonymous Portuguese cartographer.

The atlas showed for the first time the east coast of Australia. Interestingly, the markings on the map were made 200 years before Captain James Cook discovered the east coast of the continent, bringing the primacy of Cook's discovery into question. However, the theory that this proves that the Portuguese made contact with Australia is contested.

Since 1924, the original atlas can be found in the Huntington Library in San Marino (California) in the USA.

Description 

The atlas consists of 68 pages, which include a calendar and 15 nautical charts with illustrations, as well as detailed maritime information. It contains illustrations of the indigenous population of the New World and is therefore an important testimony to colonisation.

The original atlas was bound in red leather with gold decorations in 1805.

An unusual feature of the work lies in the fact that the map reverses the common orientation of the world, with the south at the top.

See also 
Theory of the Portuguese discovery of Australia

References

External links 
 The Huntington Library.
 Veröffentlichtes Bild in der Tageszeitung El Mundo 15. Oktober 2015.
 Faksimileausgabe 2008 veröffentlicht von dem Verlag M.Moleiro.

Atlases
1547 works
Pre-1606 contact with Australia